Pseudaphelia is a genus of moths in the family Saturniidae first described by William Forsell Kirby in 1892.

Species
Pseudaphelia ansorgei Rothschild, 1898
Pseudaphelia apollinaris (Boisduval, 1847)
Pseudaphelia dialitha Tams, 1930
Pseudaphelia flava Bouvier, 1930
Pseudaphelia flavomarginata Gaede, 1915
Pseudaphelia karemii Bouvier, 1927
Pseudaphelia luteola Bouvier, 1930
Pseudaphelia roseibrunnea Gaede, 1927
Pseudaphelia simplex Rebel, 1906

References

Saturniinae
Moth genera